"Tu Mirada en Mi" is a Latin pop song  written and recorded by American duo Ha*Ash. It was released on April 22, 2006 as the fourth of the single from their second studio album Mundos Opuestos (2005).

Background and release 
"Tu Mirada en Mi" was written by Ashley Grace, Hanna Nicole, Áureo Baqueiro and Gian Marco and produced by Baqueiro. Is a song recorded by American duo Ha*Ash from her second studio album Mundos Opuestos (2005). It was released as the fourth single from the album on April 22, 2006, by Sony Music Entertainment.

Commercial  performance 
The track peaked at number 50 in the Latin Pop Songs charts in the United States.

Music video 
A music video for "Tu Mirada en Mi" was released in April, 2006. Was published on her YouTube channel on October 24, 2009. It was directed by David Ruiz. , the video has over 62 million views on YouTube.

Credits and personnel 
Credits adapted from AllMusic and Genius.

Recording and management

 Recording Country: United States
 Sony / ATV Discos Music Publishing LLC / Westwood Publishing
 (P) 2005 Sony Music Entertainment México, S.A. De C.V.

Ha*Ash
 Ashley Grace  – vocals, guitar
 Hanna Nicole  – vocals, guitar 
Additional personnel
 Áureo Baqueiro  – songwriting, recording engineer, arranger, director 
 Gian Marco  – songwriting.
 Gerardo García  – guitar, acoustic guitar, mandoline.
 Tommy Morgan  – harmonica.
 Gabe Witcher  – violin.

Charts

Awards and nominations

Release history

References 

Ha*Ash songs
2005 songs
2006 singles
Songs written by Ashley Grace
Songs written by Hanna Nicole
Songs written by Áureo Baqueiro
Songs written by Gian Marco
Song recordings produced by Áureo Baqueiro
Spanish-language songs
Pop ballads
Sony Music Latin singles
2000s ballads